Tevita Vaʻenuku (born 27 December 1967) is a Tongan former rugby union player. He played as wing.

Career
Vaʻenuku debuted for Tonga on 28 May 1991, against Samoa in Nuku'alofa. He was also part of the Tonga national team in the 1995 Rugby World Cup, playing all the three pool stage matches, scoring a try against France in Pretoria. His last cap for Tonga was during the third pool stage match against Ivory Coast in Rustenburg. Vaʻenuku was also part of the 1993 and 1997 Rugby World Cup Sevens squads.
In 2005, Vaʻenuku was part of the Ikale Tahi management team, along with Sione Petelo, Nafe Tufui and Semi Taupeaafe.

References

External links

1967 births
Living people
Tongan rugby union players
Rugby union wings
Tonga international rugby union players